Štip is the largest urban agglomeration in the eastern part of North Macedonia, serving as the economic, industrial, entertainment and educational focal point for the surrounding municipalities.

As of the 2021 census, the city of Štip had a population of about 44,866

Štip is the largest textile production center in the country. It is the center of the fashion industry in North Macedonia, as well as the site of the sole public university in eastern North Macedonia, Goce Delčev University of Štip.

The city of Štip is the seat of Štip Municipality.

Name
The name Astibos is mentioned first by the ancient historian Polyaenus in 2nd century BC, who notes that Paeonian kings did ritualistic bathing in the Astibo / Brigantium (today: Bregalnica) river, as a coronation ritual. Astibo is also marked in the Tabula Peutingeriana, as one of the stations from Stobi (near modern Gradsko) to Serdika (today: Sofia). The name evolved from the ancient Astibos, to Byzantine Stipeon, to modern Shtip.

It is generally acknowledged that the Slavic 'Štip' follows Proto-Albanian phonetic rules and was acquired via the Albanian 'Shtip'. Shtip may indicate that Proto-Albanian was spoken in the region in pre-Slavic antiquity. The local Aromanian community also refer to the city as ‘’.

Geography and Climate

The city is located at the intersection of the Lakavica, Ovče Pole, and Kočani valleys.

Two rivers pass through Štip,
 the Bregalnica which is the second largest in North Macedonia, and
 the Otinja which divides the city center.

The hill Isar, with its early medieval fortress on top, dominates the city and provides for the common reference as The city under the Isar.

Spring usually comes in February, when most of the foliage is regenerating, although freak snow storms could appear as late as May.

The soil is mostly sandy, and has large patches of red soil (crvenica) which indicates large percentage of Iron in the soil.

The geographical area of the city of Štip is bordered
 by the mountain Plačkovica east,
 by the Krivolak valley south-east,
 the estuary of the river Bregalnica in the south-west, and
 by its alluvial plain in the north.

History

Antiquity
It is probable that the capital of the Paeonian royal house was in the area of Astibus (Astivos, Άστιβος in Ancient Greek).

The Paeonians were situated in the region west of the fertile river Axius basin, around the 5th and 4th centuries BC. The two tribes that lived along the river Astibo, an estuary to the Axius, were the Derrones, named after their god of healing, Darron, and the Laeaeans, who minted their own heavy coins as a sign of their sovereignty following the example of the Greek city-states on Chalkidiki. Although these tribes were heavily weakened by the Persian invasion of 480 BC, led by King Xerxes I, they remained a formidable power and a well-organized people, renowned for the production of their exceptionally heavy coins with emblems including domesticated specimens of the wild aurochs for which Paeonia was also famous. They were absorbed into the Macedonian empire by Alexander I before 360 BC.

The area itself is first mentioned in the writings of the historian Polien from the 3rd century BC, who talks of a river named "Astibo" which is presumed to be the river Bregalnica today. Polien also states that the Paeonian emperors were crowned in Astibo.

The first mention of a settlement dates to the reign of Roman emperor Tiberius (14-37 AD), when Estipeon is mentioned as an important settlement in the Roman province of Paeonia and the second stop on the Roman road from Stobi to Pautalia.

In the 6th century, the Slavs raided the Balkans and destroyed the Byzantine settlement, and the Slavic tribe of Sagudats permanently settled the area.

In the 9th century, Cyril and Methodius crossed this region and Christianized it, on their way to Great Moravia.

Middle Ages
Many rulers controlled the area of Štip during the early Middle Ages.

Štip was part of the Bulgarian Empire but after the Byzantine victory in the Battle of Kleidion in 1014 it fell again under Byzantine rule until the reestablishment of the Bulgarian Empire in 1185.

From the mid-13th century the town changed hands several times.

By 1284, Serbian King Stefan Milutin conquered the region; he mentioned Štip explicitly in 1308 and did not wish to give it up to the Byzantines.

In a document of Serbian Tsar Stefan Uroš that dates between 1293 and 1302, in which the citizens of Štip are named, there are several figures listed with Albanian names and anthroponomy. Furthermore, in a 1330 letter by Serbian Tsar Stefan Dušan, several figures with Albanian names and anthroponomy (including the last name Arbanasin, which literally means Albanian) were recorded. 

In 1334, the Church of the Holy Archangel in Štip, built by protosebastos Hrelja who held the region under the Serbian crown, was according to his wish granted (metochion) to Hilandar, in a charter of King Stefan Dušan.

The region was annexed by the Ottoman Empire after a raid in 1385. It was known as İştip and was made seat of a sanjak.

There is little information about the development of Štip during Ottoman rule which would continue for the next five centuries, interrupted only during 1689–1690 when the city was taken by the Austrians for two years. In the late 19th and early 20th century, Štip was part of the Kosovo Vilayet of the Ottoman Empire.

20th century

In 1912, at the start of the Balkan Wars, Štip and the surrounding area was occupied by Bulgaria. But Bulgaria's defeat in 1913, resulted in the annexation of all of Vardar Macedonia into the Kingdom of Serbia. Stip was occupied by Bulgaria and Germany during WW1.

Events concerning the Kingdom of Serbia meant that Štip then became a part of the Kingdom of Serbs, Croats and Slovenes together with the rest of Vardar Macedonia.

From 1929 to 1941, Štip was part of the Vardar Banovina of the Kingdom of Yugoslavia.

On 6 April 1941, when Yugoslavia was attacked by Nazi Germany, the city was bombed by German planes which took off from Bulgaria. During the Second World War the Axis-allied Bulgarian forces occupied the city until early September, 1944, after which it was taken by German troops. Štip was retaken by the Macedonian National Liberation Army and the newly allied Bulgarian Army, now part of the anti-Axis coalition on 8 November 1944.

Thus 8 November is celebrated as 'Liberation Day' in the city and municipality of Štip, and is a non-working holiday.

Demographics
According to the National Census of 2002 the populations of Štip Municipality breaks down as follows:

Economy

Today, Štip is the center of the country's textile and fashion industry.

Formerly the home of such industrial giants in Former Yugoslavia like
 the Cotton Industry "Makedonka" - Štip, with its enormous suburban campus, and
 the Fashion Industry "Astibo".
From their ashes many private mini-factories were created, mostly by former managers in the socialist giants, which employ most of the women in town today, fashion and textile still being the core skills of the city population, as maintained by the educational system.

Some of the larger private textile and fashion houses in Štip are:
 Albatros,
 Beas-S,
 Kit–Go Teks,
 Gracija,
 Modena,
 Mavis,
 Maksima,
 LARS,
 Linea,
 Briteks,
 Stipko,
 Stip-teks,
 Longurov,
 Vivendi,
 D&A,
 Amareta,
 Anateks,
 Angroteks,
 EAM,
 Milano,
 Vabo,
 Zogori,
 Metro Premier,
 Tekstil Invest-Denim,
 Tekstil Logistik and
 Eskada.

Government
The current mayor of Štip is Ivan Jordanov.

The city is ruled by the "City Council" which is elected every four years.  The counselors are usually members of the strongest political parties. Every City Council elects a President. The President of the City Council leads the sessions and also signs the decisions together with city mayor.

Transportation

The public transport is organized in suburban services and inter-city.

The suburbs of
 Babi,
 Senjak,
 Prebeg,
 Makedonka,
 Novo Selo and Kezhovica, etc.
are served by a fleet of municipal buses running 7 days a week and connecting several locations in the city center with the suburbs.

The inter-city services are provided by the public transportation company "Balkan Ekspres" which has connections to all cities in North Macedonia as well as some neighboring countries.

The train station located in the northern suburb "Zheleznichka" provides links to
 Kočani in the east, and
 Veles and Skopje to the west.

There is a large fleet of private taxi vehicles in the city, with very competitive prices.

You can visit Stip traveling by car using the highway M-5 (Stip-Kocani-Delcevo) in North Macedonia, and the connection to E-75 highway Stip-Veles.

Travel direction in the region goes via route R-601 (Stip-Plackovica) and R-526 that goes through the city and connects to freeway M-5.

Education
There are numerous pre-school, elementary/primary and middle school institutions in Štip.

There are five high/secondary schools, each somewhat specialized in a particular field, according to the educational policy of North Macedonia. The five high schools are as follows:
 Medical Secondary School "Jane Sandanski" - web site
 Music High School - facebook page
 Textile Secondary School "Dimitar Mirasčiev" - web site
 Secondary School for Children with Special Needs — Iskra  	- web site
 Electro-Technical Secondary School "Kole Nehtenin" - web site
 Lyceum "Slavčo Stojmenski" - web site

The city is also the home of one of the four public universities of North Macedonia, the Goce Delčev University of Štip.

The private music high school "Oksia" completes the list of educational institutions in the city.

Architecture and Sights

Štip has a ruins of an old castle which keeps a watchful eye on the town from the Isar Hill.

In the town and its vicinity there are three 14th-century churches, built in the time when the town was a part of medieval Serbia.
 The oldest one is the monastery church of St Michael under Isar hill, built in 1332 by protosevast Hrelja who donated it to Chilandar, the Serbian monastery on Mount Athos.
 On the south slope of Isar stands a small St John the Baptist church built by nobleman Jovan Probištitović from 1350.
 A single nave church dedicated to Ascension (Sveti Spas) was built in 1369 by duke Dimitrije. In it one can still see original, 14th c frescoes as well as those from its reconstruction on 1601, done by master Jovan.

The Bezisten, a massive stone building which used to be a closed bazaar (now an art gallery) is a remnant of the Ottoman influence in the city.

In the old parts of the town (and especially in Novo Selo) some houses built in the Ottoman style of architecture can still be found.

The town also boasts the healing powers of the Kežovica mineral spa and with the ruins of the ancient city of Bargala.

The ancient town Bargala is located at the foot of mountain Plackovica. Nearby is the river Kozjacka and small village called Kozjak. It is believed that the ruins found there belong to ancient town Bargala. The town was built in the early 4th century, because there are some Roman documents found, containing information that the city gate of Bargala was built by Anthon Alipius, administrator of the province.

Arts and Culture
Štip boasts the largest festival of pop music in North Macedonia, called MakFest. It has been held every November in the cultural center, "Aco Šopov", for over two decades.

Another large cultural event in Štip is the "Štip Summer of Culture", which is a monthlong festival held from 1 July to 1 August, since 1987.

The first known opera performance in North Macedonia was staged in Štip in 1925.

Sports and Recreation
Štip has four professional football teams,
 FK Bregalnica Štip which plays in the Macedonian First League,
 FK Babi which plays in the regional leagues,
 FK Astibo which play in the regional leagues and
 "Kezovica" which plays in the 3rd League East.
 Panda Basketball Academy
The Gradski stadion Štip is the main stadium and it hosted the 2011–12 Macedonian Cup final.

RK Tekstilec is the handball club from Štip and they play at the hall OU Tošo Arsov.

Media
Štip has many media establishments.

The first private television in North Macedonia (and also in former Yugoslavia) was founded in Štip by Mr. Mile Kokotov in 1989. It was "TEKO TV", which is not operational any more.

The other currently operational local TV stations are
 "TV IRIS" and
 "TV STAR".

Important radio stations are
 "Kanal-77",
 "Radio Štip" and
 the Roma language radio station "Radio Cherenja".

The local newspaper is called "Štipski Vesnik".

Notable people

 
 General Mihajlo Apostolski, the first commander of the Army of People's Republic of Macedonia
 Ljubčo Georgievski, 1998-2002 former Prime Minister of the Republic of Macedonia
 Kiro Gligorov, former president of the Republic of Macedonia
 Ljupčo Jordanovski, former acting president of the Republic of Macedonia
 Nikola Kljusev, first Prime Minister of the independent Republic of Macedonia
 Lyubomir Miletich, Bulgarian linguist, ethnographer, dialectologist and historian
 Bojan Miovski, footballer
 Ferus Mustafov, Romani musician
 Nataša Petrović, actress of Serbian descent
 Dragoslav Šekularac, a former-Yugoslav football legend
 Aco Šopov, poet
 Zoran Vanev, pop-folk singer

International relations

Twin towns – Sister cities
Štip is twinned with:
 Split, Croatia
 Balıkesir, Turkey

See also

 Aktiva

Notes

References

Bibliography

External links
 

 Official web site of the city of Štip
 Official web page for National Broadcast Radio Network Kanal77
 TV Star
 Iris TV
 Radio Štip
  Radio Čerenja

 
Towns in North Macedonia